Ahmed Alaaeldin (born 31 January 1993), also known as Ahmed Alaa, is a professional footballer who currently plays for Al-Gharafa. Born in Egypt, he plays for the Qatar national football team.

Personal
Ahmed Alaaeldin arrived in Qatar when he was 10 years old. His father, an Egyptian civil engineer, brought his family to Qatar in 2003.

Club career
Alaaeldin began his professional career with Al-Rayyan SC in 2010. In July 2017, he joined Al-Gharafa SC. He scored in the 2011 AFC Champions League game against Emirates Club.

International career
Ahmed Alaaeldin has played for the Qatar Olympic football team in the GGC U23 tournament in August 2011. Ahmed was also at the 2016 AFC U-23 Championship and was the top goal scorer with 6 goals during the competition.

International goals
Scores and results list Qatar's goal tally first.

Honours
Al-Rayyan
Qatari Stars League: 2015–16
Qatar Cup: 2012 
Emir of Qatar Cup: 2011
Qatari Sheikh Jassim Cup: 2013

Al-Gharafa
Qatari Stars Cup: 2017–18, 2018–19

Qatar
AFC Asian Cup: 2019

References

External links

1993 births
Living people
Qatari footballers
Al-Rayyan SC players
Association football forwards
Naturalised citizens of Qatar
Al-Gharafa SC players
Qatar Stars League players
Qatari Second Division players
2019 AFC Asian Cup players
2021 CONCACAF Gold Cup players
Qatari people of Egyptian descent
AFC Asian Cup-winning players
Qatar international footballers
2022 FIFA World Cup players